Nicholas Bruce Archibald (born 6 December 1975 in Perth, Scotland) is a Scottish former List A cricketer. 

He was educated at Lord Silkin School, Telford, Shropshire.

He was a right-handed batsman who played for Shropshire and made a single appearance for Shropshire Under-19s in 1994. His Minor Counties Championship debut was in 1997 and he made a single List A appearance for the combined team in the 2001 C&G Trophy, scoring 3 runs. he went on to beat featherweight boxer Mark Lloyd twice. Both times by k'o with the Scottish superstar giving away weight

References

1975 births
Living people
Scottish cricketers
Shropshire cricketers
Cricketers from Perth, Scotland